Justice Crawford may refer to:

Geoffrey W. Crawford, associate justice of the Vermont Supreme Court
Martin Jenkins Crawford, associate justice of the Supreme Court of Georgia
Samuel Crawford (jurist), associate justice of the Wisconsin Supreme Court